The Daytime Emmy Award for Outstanding Entertainment Talk Show Host was an award annually presented by the National Academy of Television Arts and Sciences (NATAS) and Academy of Television Arts & Sciences (ATAS). The award was given in honor of a talk show host that was in the entertainment nature. It was awarded from the 42nd Daytime Emmy Awards ceremony, held in 2015, to the 49th Daytime Emmy Awards ceremony, held in 2022. During this period, the generic Outstanding Talk Show Host category was split into two specific categories: this award and Outstanding Informative Talk Show Host. In 2023, the NATAS will merge the two specific categories back into one.

Winners and nominees
Listed below are the winners of the award for each year, as well as the other nominees.

2010s

2020s

Multiple wins
3 wins
Kelly Clarkson
Kelly Ripa
2 wins
Michael Strahan

Multiple nominations
8 nominations 
Kelly Ripa

6 nominations 
Sara Gilbert
Sharon Osborne
Sheryl Underwood 

5 nominations

Julie Chen
Ryan Seacrest

4 nominations

Joy Behar
Whoopi Goldberg
Adrienne Houghton
Loni Love
Jeannie Mai
Tamera Mowry-Housley
Aisha Tyler 
Wendy Williams

3 nominations

Kelly Clarkson
Paula Faris
Sunny Hostin
Sara Haines
Michael Strahan

2 nominations

Tamar Braxton
Drew Barrymore
Jedediah Bila
Candace Cameron Bure
Jenna Bush Hager
Harry Connick Jr.
Eve
Carrie Ann Inaba
Hoda Kotb
Meghan McCain
Raven-Symoné

References

External links
 Daytime Emmy Awards at the Internet Movie Database

Talk Show Host Entertainment
Awards established in 2015
2015 establishments in California
Awards disestablished in 2022